Susanna Harutyunyan (born February 15, 1963) is an Armenian writer who has created eight novels. In 2016 she won the Presidential Award for Literature.

Life 
Harutyunyan was born in Karchaghbyur in 1963.

After writing eight novels including Map Without Land and Waters her work has been translated into Persian, Greek, Romanian, Azerbaijani, German, Kazakh and English.

Harutyunyan organised the Kauaran group of writers and the editor of Kayaran literary magazine and she also writes short stories.

In 2016 she won the Presidential Award for Literature for her novel Ravens before Noah. That novel had been translated into English in 2011. Her play "The Harmony" was performed in Iran after it was translated into Persian.

References 

1963 births
Living people
People from Gegharkunik Province
Armenian writers